Miro Aaltonen (born 7 June 1993) is a Finnish professional ice hockey forward for EHC Kloten of the National League (NL). Aaltonen was selected by Atlant Moscow Oblast in the 2nd round (45th overall) of the 2011 KHL Junior Draft, and he was also selected by the Anaheim Ducks in the 6th round (177th overall) of the 2013 NHL Entry Draft.

Playing career
Following the 2016–17 season, after recording a career-best 44 points in 59 games after his first season with HC Vityaz in the Kontinental Hockey League, he signed an entry-level contract with the Toronto Maple Leafs on 17 March 2017.

Despite a strong push for a roster spot as the Leafs' fourth-line center, he was assigned to the Maple Leafs American Hockey League affiliate, the Toronto Marlies for the 2017–18 season. In adapting to his first North American season, Aaltonen established himself among the offensive leaders with the Marlies, contributing 20 goals and 43 points in 64 regular season games. Unable to earn a call-up to the NHL, Aaltonen continued in the post-season with the Marlies, helping claim the club's first Calder Cup in posting 13 points in 20 games.

As an impending restricted free agent from the Maple Leafs but unable to make his NHL debut, Aaltonen opted to return to the KHL on a contract with former Russian club, Vityaz on 1 July 2018.

Following his first full season with SKA Saint Petersburg in 2020–21, Aaltonen was returned in trade, alongside Viktor Antipin, to former club HC Vityaz in exchange for four prospects on 15 June 2021.

On 1 May 2022, Aaltonen left Vityaz as a free agent and was announced to have signed a two-year contract to remain in the KHL with Avtomobilist Yekaterinburg. Having signed before the Russian invasion of Ukraine, Aaltonen sought a release from his contract with Avtomobilist and on 21 June 2022, was signed to a two-year contract with Swiss club, EHC Kloten of the NL.

Career statistics

Regular season and playoffs

International

Awards and honors

References

External links
 
 Miro Aaltonen at Beijing 2022
 
 

1993 births
Living people
People from Joensuu
Anaheim Ducks draft picks
Espoo Blues players
Finnish ice hockey centres
Jokipojat players
EHC Kloten players
Oulun Kärpät players
SKA Saint Petersburg players
Toronto Marlies players
HC Vityaz players
Ice hockey players at the 2022 Winter Olympics
Olympic ice hockey players of Finland
Medalists at the 2022 Winter Olympics
Olympic gold medalists for Finland
Olympic medalists in ice hockey
Sportspeople from North Karelia